Table tennis at the 1984 Summer Paralympics consisted of 39 events, 24 for men and 15 for women.

Medal table

Medal summary

Men's events

Women's events

References 

 

1984 Summer Paralympics events
1984
Paralympics
Table tennis competitions in the United Kingdom
Table tennis competitions in the United States